The Albemarle Charlottesville Historical Society was founded in 1940 and is the leading steward of the history of Albemarle County, Virginia and Charlottesville, Virginia. It has been located since 1994 in the McIntire Building, Charlottesville's original public library building.

References

Albemarle County, Virginia
Organizations based in Charlottesville, Virginia
History of Charlottesville, Virginia